Electric Jewels is the third studio album by Canadian rock band April Wine, released in November 1973 by Aquarius Records. In a 2007 publication by Goose Lane Editions, Electric Jewels ranked number 73 on Bob Mersereau's 2007 musical reference book The Top 100 Canadian Albums.

Electric Jewels was marked by significant changes within April Wine as the Henman brothers left the band, and were replaced by guitarist Gary Moffet and drummer Jerry Mercer.

Track listing
All tracks written by Myles Goodwyn and Jim Clench unless noted otherwise.
 "Weeping Widow" (Robert Wright, AKA. Art La King) – 3:54
 "Just Like That" – 3:09
 "Electric Jewels" – 5:59
 "You Opened up My Eyes" – 4:50
 "Come on Along" – 4:29
 "Lady Run, Lady Hide" – 2:57
 "I Can Hear You Callin'" – 3:25
 "Cat's Claw" – 4:46
 "The Band has Just Begun" – 4:12

Personnel

April Wine 
 Myles Goodwyn – lead vocals, guitars, mandolin, piano, mellotron
 Jim Clench – vocals, bass, arp
 Gary Moffet – guitars, vocals
 Jerry Mercer – percussion, vocals

Production
 Ralph Murphy – producer
 Terry Brown – recording engineer
 Dave Halbert – mixing engineer

Additional personnel
 David Henman – guitar
 Ritchie Henman – drums
 Richard Newell – harmonica
 Pierre Senecal – organ
 Al Nicholls – background vocals
 Pam Marsh – background vocals
 Bhen Lazaroni – string arrangements

References

April Wine albums
1973 albums
Aquarius Records (Canada) albums